Tuckahoe Apartments, also known as The Tuckahoe, is a historic apartment building in Richmond, Virginia. It was designed by W. Duncan Lee and built in 1928–1929.  It is a massive, six-story, red brick, Georgian Revival style building. It was built as a luxury "apartment-hotel".  The building features original brick-walled entry court, parlors, galleries, solaria, roof terraces, and a domed cupola.  The building has 59 apartments.

It was listed on the National Register of Historic Places in 2001.

References

Residential buildings on the National Register of Historic Places in Virginia
Georgian Revival architecture in Virginia
Residential buildings completed in 1929
Buildings and structures in Richmond, Virginia
National Register of Historic Places in Richmond, Virginia